Procambarus steigmani, sometimes called the Parkhill Prairie crayfish, is a species of crayfish in the family Cambaridae. It is endemic to Parkhill Prairie, in the Trinity River basin of Collin County, Texas, and is listed as Data Deficient on the IUCN Red List, although it may be a synonym of Procambarus regalis.

References

Cambaridae
Freshwater crustaceans of North America
Endemic fauna of Texas
Taxonomy articles created by Polbot
Crustaceans described in 1991
Taxa named by Horton H. Hobbs Jr.